The Milli Piyango Curling Arena, is an indoor curling rink in  Erzurum, Turkey. Opened in 2010, it is the country's first and only curling facility as of 2012. The arena has five curling sheets and 1,000 seating capacity.

The arena was built for the 2011 Winter Universiade, and opened in September 2010. The construction cost was  9 million (approx. $ 6.3 million). It is situated in the Mecidiye neighborhood, in the northeastern city outskirts.

Fully equipped to host international competitions, it has five curling sheets and can hold 1,000 spectators.

Events hosted

References

Indoor arenas in Turkey
Sports venues completed in 2010
Sports venues in Erzurum
Curling in Turkey
Curling venues in Turkey
Curling clubs